Borozdinovsky is a rural locality (a settlement) in Novopokrovskoye Rural Settlement, Novokhopyorsky District, Voronezh Oblast, Russia. The population was 675 as of 2010. There are 13 streets.

Geography 
Borozdinovsky is located 38 km northwest of Novokhopyorsk (the district's administrative centre) by road. Shevlyaginsky is the nearest rural locality.

References 

Populated places in Novokhopyorsky District